The 2014 Texas Wild season was the 22nd season of the franchise in World TeamTennis (WTT) and its second and final season in Texas.

The Wild had 6 wins and 8 losses and finished last in the Western Conference. It failed to qualify for the playoffs.

On February 23, 2015, WTT announced that a new ownership group had taken control of the Wild and moved the team to Citrus Heights, California, renaming it the California Dream.

Season recap

Bryan Brothers traded
On January 23, 2014, the Wild traded Bob and Mike Bryan to the San Diego Aviators in exchange for undisclosed financial consideration.

Drafts
Since the Wild had the better record of the two conference championship match losers in 2013 at 9 wins and 5 losses, it had the third-to-last (sixth) selection in each round of the WTT Marquee Player Draft and moved up to fifth in the Roster Player Draft after the contraction of the Las Vegas Neon. The Wild passed on making any selections at the marquee player draft. The Wild protected Aisam Qureshi, Alex Bogomolov, Jr. and Darija Jurak and drafted Anabel Medina Garrigues in the roster player draft.

Free agent player signings
On July 16, 2014, the Wild signed Tim Smyczek as a substitute player.

Early season success
The Wild opened its season with a road victory against the Boston Lobsters on July 6, 2014. It won the first four sets of the match to take a 20–9 lead. The Wild was led by Anabel Medina Garrigues who won the women's singles set and paired with Darija Jurak to take the women's doubles and with Aisam Qureshi to win the mixed doubles. Alex Bogomolov, Jr. got the Wid started with a set win in men's singles. The Lobsters won the final set of men's doubles to send the match to overtime. But Bogomolov and Qureshi won the first game of overtime to seal a 23–14 victory.

The following night, the Wild visited the Springfield Lasers in a rematch of the 2013 Western Conference Championship Match. After the Wild won the first two sets to take a 10–4 lead, the Lasers cut the deficit at halftime to 10–9 by sweeping five straight games of mixed doubles. Medina Garrigues won the women's singles set, 5–2, to extend the Wild's lead to 15–11. But the Lasers took the fifth set of men's singles, 5–1, to tie the match at 16 and send it to a super tiebreaker. After struggling in the final set, Bogomolov was able to redeem himself by taking the tiebreaker, 7–5, to secure a 17–16 victory.

The Wild met the three-time defending WTT Champion Washington Kastles in its home opener on July 8, 2014. The Wild won only one of the five sets in a 24–15 loss.

The Wild won another thrilling road match on July 10, 2014, against the San Diego Aviators. Trailing 18–14 after four sets, Bogomolov and Qureshi took the men's doubles set, 5–1, to tie the match at 19 and send it to a super tiebreaker which they won, 7–6, on a match-deciding point to secure a 20–19 victory.

The following night, the Wild returned home to meet the Philadelphia Freedoms. It found itself behind again, 18–16, after four sets. Once again, Bogomolov and Qureshi produced a dramatic comeback. They won the final set of men's doubles, 5–3, to tie the match at 21 and send it to a super tiebreaker. Bogomolov and Qureshi dominated the tiebreaker, 7–1, to give the Wild a 22–21 victory and a record of 4 wins and 1 loss.

Mid-season struggle
After starting the season strong, the Wild lost four of its next five matches to drop its record to 5 wins and 5 losses. The run started with a road loss against the Springfield Lasers. Alex Bogomolov, Jr. won the fifth set of men's singles to tie the match at 18. But the Lasers won the super tiebreaker, 7–6, on a match-deciding point to earn a 19–18 victory.

The struggling Wild hosted the Austin Aces on July 17, 2014, in the first-ever match between the in-state rivals after the Aces moved to Greater Austin from Orange County, California. The Wild had an 18–16 lead after four sets. The Aces won the final set  of mixed doubles, 5–4, to force overtime and then won an overtime game to tie the match at 22. The Aces took the tiebreaker, 7–4, to earn a 23–22 victory.

Late season collapse
After losing to the Aces at home the previous night, the Wild traveled to Cedar Park for a rematch on July 18, 2014. The Wild won four of the five sets in a dominant 23–12 victory. Anabel Medina Garrigues closed out the match with a set win in women's singles after earlier recording set wins in mixed doubles with Aisam Qureshi and in women's doubles with Darija Jurak. Alex Bogomolov, Jr. got the Wild started with a win in the opening set of men's singles. The win gave the Wild 6 wins and 5 losses and control over its playoff destiny. At the point, the San Diego Aviators led the conference with 6 wins and 4 losses, the Springfield Lasers were third at 5 wins and 5 losses, ½ match behind the Wild, and the Aces had 4 wins and 6 losses.

The following evening, the Wild lost a critical match at home to the Lasers to drop to third place in the standings. The Wild dropped all five sets in the 25–16 defeat.

In what would prove to be the final home match for the franchise in Irving, the Wild dropped four of the five sets in falling to the Aces, 22–16.

In the final match for the franchise as the Texas Wild, the team dropped four of the five sets in a 22–13 road loss to the Aviators.

Despite closing the season with three straight defeats and finishing with a losing record at 6 wins and 8 losses, the Wild remained mathematically alive in the playoff race on the season's final day. It needed losses by both the Lasers and the Aces to create a three-way tie for second place in the Western Conference. For the Wild to win the standings tiebreaker, the Lasers had to win 17 or fewer games in their final match. Once the Lasers took a 17–3 lead on their way to a 25–7 victory over the Boston Lobsters, the Wild's season came to an end.

Move to California
On February 23, 2015, WTT announced that a new ownership group had taken control of the Wild and moved the team to Citrus Heights, California, renaming it the California Dream.

Event chronology
 January 23, 2014: The Wild traded Bob and Mike Bryan to the San Diego Aviators in exchange for undisclosed financial consideration.
 March 11, 2014: The Wild protected Aisam Qureshi, Alex Bogomolov, Jr. and Darija Jurak and drafted Anabel Medina Garrigues in the WTT Roster Player Draft.
 July 16, 2014: The Wild signed Tim Smyczek as a substitute player.
 July 20, 2014: The Wild lost its final home match in Irving to the Austin Aces, 22–16.
 July 22, 2014: The franchise lost its final match as the Texas Wild to the San Diego Aviators, 22–13.
 July 23, 2014: With a record of 6 wins and 8 losses, the Wild was eliminated from playoff contention when the Springfield Lasers defeated the Boston Lobsters, 25–7.
 February 23, 2015: WTT announced that a new ownership group had taken control of the Wild and moved the team to Citrus Heights, California, renaming it the California Dream.

Draft picks
Since the Wild had the better record of the two conference championship match losers in 2013 at 9 wins and 5 losses, it had the third-to-last (sixth) selection in each round of the WTT Marquee Player Draft and moved up to fifth in the Roster Player Draft after the contraction of the Las Vegas Neon.

Marquee player draft
The Wild passed on making any selections at the WTT Marquee Player Draft.

Roster player draft
The Wild protected Aisam Qureshi, Alex Bogomolov, Jr. and Darija Jurak and drafted Anabel Medina Garrigues in the WTT Roster Player Draft. The selections made by the Wild are shown in the table below.

Match log

{| align="center" border="1" cellpadding="2" cellspacing="1" style="border:1px solid #aaa"
|-
! colspan="2" style="background:black; color:magenta" | Legend
|-
! bgcolor="ccffcc" | Wild Win
! bgcolor="ffbbbb" | Wild Loss
|-
! colspan="2" | Home team in CAPS
|}

Team personnel
Reference:

On-court personnel
  Brent Haygarth – Head Coach
  Alex Bogomolov, Jr.
  Darija Jurak
  Anabel Medina Garrigues
  Aisam Qureshi
  Tim Smyczek

Front office
 Jeff Launius – Owner and General Manager
 Mel Launius – Owner

Notes:

Statistics
Players are listed in order of their game-winning percentage provided they played in at least 40% of the Wild's games in that event, which is the WTT minimum for qualification for league leaders in individual statistical categories.

Men's singles

Women's singles

Men's doubles

Women's doubles

Mixed doubles

Team totals

Transactions
 January 23, 2014: The Wild traded Bob and Mike Bryan to the San Diego Aviators in exchange for undisclosed financial consideration.
 March 11, 2014: The Wild protected Aisam Qureshi, Alex Bogomolov, Jr. and Darija Jurak and drafted Anabel Medina Garrigues in the WTT Roster Player Draft.
 March 11, 2014: The Wild left Eugenie Bouchard, Elena Bovina and Tara Snyder unprotected in the WTT Roster Player Draft, effectively making them free agents. 
 March 26, 2014: The Wild left Jim Courier unprotected at the end of the wildcard player protection window, effectively making him a free agent.
 July 16, 2014: The Wild signed Tim Smyczek as a substitute player.

Individual honors and achievements
Anabel Medina Garrigues was named WTT Female Rookie of the Year.

Alex Bogomolov, Jr. was third in WTT in game-winning percentage in men's doubles. Aisam Qureshi was sixth.

Charitable support
During each night of the 2014 season, the WTT team with the most aces received US$1,000 toward a local charity of the team's choice as part of a program called Mylan Aces. In the case of a tie, the award was split accordingly. The Wild earned $1,500 for Emily's Place through the program.

See also

References

External links
Texas Wild official website
World TeamTennis official website

Texas Wild season
Texas Wild 2014
Texas Wild season
California Dream seasons
2014 in American tennis